Woodrow Lewis Chambliss (October 14, 1914 in Bowie, Texas – January 8, 1981 in Ojai, California) was an American character actor who appeared in both feature films and television. He is probably best known for his appearances as several characters in the TV hit Gunsmoke, where he eventually settled into the recurring role of storekeeper Mr. Lathrop. He was sometimes credited as Woody Chambliss.

Career
Chambliss was the son of Lorenzo Dow “L.D.” and Lucinda Mae (Thornton) Chambliss, who had a farm outside Brownfield, Texas. He attended public schools in Brownsville and Baylor University, where his first contact with drama occurred as a prompter with the Baylor Little Theater. In 1938 traveled to Dartington Hall, Dartington, England as a drama exchange student. He made his Broadway debut in a 1939 Chekhov production of The Possessed. The cast also included his wife, Erika Kapralik, and actor Ford Rainey, but the play only ran for fourteen performances on Broadway.

During World War II, he worked at the Naval Construction Battalion Center Port Hueneme naval base in Port Hueneme, California. After the war, he, Rainey and others from the Chekhov company established the High Valley Players, a touring repertory troupe that for four years performed in and around Ojai, California. Chambliss went on to become the manager of the Senior Canyon Mutual Water Company prior to resuming his theater career.

In addition to his work on Gunsmoke, where he eventually settled into the recurring role of storekeeper Mr. Lathrop, he also had a recurring role as riverboat Captain Tom of the "Sultana" on the TV show Yancy Derringer.

He also appeared in two 1958 episodes of Perry Mason: as Phil Reese in "The Case of the Fugitive Nurse," and Fred Haley in "The Case of the Lucky Loser."  In 1960 he appeared in Gene Barry's TV Western series Bat Masterson as town undertaker Mr. O’Malley (S2E20).  In 1965, he appeared on The Andy Griffith Show in the episode, "Aunt Bee's Invisible Beau", as their butter-and-egg-man.  He and wife Erika also appeared together as grandparents in the 1978 TV movie Forever.
He also played the role of Zadok Walton, cousin to grandpa Walton, on a Season 8 episode of "The Waltons."

He died on January 8, 1981, in Ojai of colon cancer.

Family
He was married to actress Erika Kapralik (September 6, 1911 – May 14, 1992 in Ojai, California).

Selected filmography

 Three Strangers (1946) – man in pub (uncredited)
 3:10 to Yuma (1957) – blacksmith (uncredited)
 Zero Hour! Wilmont's drinking buddy (uncredited)
 Invitation to a Gunfighter (1964) (uncredited)
 The Andy Griffith Show (1965) – Mr. Hendricks, egg man/Mr. Robinson, piano owner (2 episodes)
 Wild Seed (1965) – Mr. Simms
 The Circle of Time (1969) – Abner, the pie pirate.
 The Wild Country (1971) – Dakota
 Glen and Randa (1971) – Sidney Miller 
 Greaser's Palace (1972) – father
 Gargoyles (1972) Uncle Willie
 Cry for Me, Billy (1972) – prospector
 Scorpio (1973) – uncredited
  The Six Million Dollar Man The Midas Touch episode (1974) – Pop
 The Devil's Rain (1975) – John
 Sgt. Pepper's Lonely Hearts Club Band (1978) – old Sgt. Pepper
 Cloud Dancer (1980) – Curtis Pitts
 Second-Hand Hearts (1981) deaf attendant

References

External links
 
 
 cowboydirectory photo of Woody Chambliss
 Michael Chekhov International Center 

1914 births
1981 deaths
20th-century American male actors
American male film actors
American male television actors
Baylor University alumni
Male actors from Texas
Military personnel from Texas
People from Bowie, Texas
People from Lubbock, Texas
United States Navy personnel of World War II
United States Navy sailors